Mark Hubbard (born May 24, 1989) is an American professional golfer.

College career
Hubbard golfed for San Jose State University from 2007 to 2011. A 2009 first-team all-Western Athletic Conference (WAC) honoree, he twice qualified for the NCAA Division I Men's Golf Championship, in 2009 and 2011. As a senior in 2011, he finished first in the WAC championship tournament. He graduated from San Jose State in December 2011 with a B.S. in business management.

Professional career
Hubbard turned professional in 2012.

In September 2013, Hubbard won his first PGA Tour Canada event at The Wildfire Invitational. He finished the season ranked third on the Order of Merit, securing him one of five Web.com Tour cards for the 2014 season.

In his first season on the Web.com Tour, Hubbard had six top-10 finishes including a runner-up to Greg Owen at the United Leasing Championship. He finished 18th on the regular-season money list and secured his first PGA Tour card. 

During his first season on the PGA Tour, Hubbard made 15 out of 25 cuts but only had a best finish of T20. He lost his card after finishing 164th in the FedEx Cup, but regained it in the Web.com Tour Finals. Hubbard had a better season in 2016, making 21 out of 30 cuts; he finished 115th in the FedEx Cup, retaining his card. In 2017 Hubbard finished 184th in the standings and lost his card, requiring him to go back to the Web.com Tour.

In 2019, Hubbard earned his first win on the Web.com Tour at the LECOM Suncoast Classic, and went on to regain his PGA Tour card by finishing ninth on the regular-season money list.

Personal life
Born in Denver, Colorado, Hubbard graduated from Colorado Academy in 2007.

In 2015, Hubbard proposed to his girlfriend of seven years, Meghan, on the 18th green at Pebble Beach, after completing his first round of the AT&T Pebble Beach Pro-Am.
They were married in 2017 and now have two daughters, Harlow and Sadie.

Amateur wins
2010 Mark Simpson Colorado Invitational
2011 WAC Championship

Professional wins (3)

Korn Ferry Tour wins (1)

PGA Tour Canada wins (1)

Golden State Tour wins (1)
2011 Twin Oaks Championship

Results in major championships
Results not in chronological order in 2020.

CUT = missed the half-way cut
"T" = tied
NT = No tournament due to COVID-19 pandemic

Results in The Players Championship

CUT = missed the halfway cut
"T" = tied
C = Canceled after the first round due to the COVID-19 pandemic

See also
2014 Web.com Tour Finals graduates
2015 Web.com Tour Finals graduates
2019 Korn Ferry Tour Finals graduates

References

External links
 
 
 

American male golfers
San Jose State Spartans men's golfers
PGA Tour golfers
Korn Ferry Tour graduates
Golfers from Denver
1989 births
Living people